Izatha rigescens is a species of moth in the family Oecophoridae. It is endemic to New Zealand. This species is classified as having the conservation status of "Data Deficient" by the Department of Conservation. It is only known from the Wellington coast. This species has not been seen since 1929.

Taxonomy 
This species was described by Edward Meyrick in 1929 using a male specimen collected by George Hudson at Point Howard in Lower Hutt in March. Hudson described and illustrated the species in his 1939 publication A supplement to the butterflies and moths of New Zealand. The holotype of this species is held at the Natural History Museum, London.

Description 
Merick described the species as follows:
The forewing of this species is brownish in colour, its scales are not contrastingly white tipped and the hindwings are pale brownish.  I. rigescens could be confused with I. gibbsi but the former is more brownish in colour and has much paler hindwings. I. rigescens could also be confused with Thamnosara sublitella as they are both similar in size and colouring. However I. rigescens lacks the tufted second segment of the labial palp of T. sublitella so the two should be easy to distinguish on close examination.

Distribution 
This species is endemic to New Zealand. This species has only been found at its type locality of Point Howard, Lower Hutt in Wellington.

Biology and behaviour
Very little about the biology of this species is known. Adults of this species are on the wing in March. The flight period is therefore rather late in the season which may have contributed to this species being overlooked.

Host species and habitat 
The host species for the larvae of this moth is unknown. It has been hypothesised that the larvae of this species feeds on dead wood. It has also been suggested that the species might be associated with lichens and/or epiphytic mosses. Hudson collected the five known species of this moth by beating coastal scrub at Point Howard.

Conservation status 
This species has been classified as having the "Data Deficient" conservation status under the New Zealand Threat Classification System.

References

External links

Photograph of holotype specimen

Oecophorinae
Moths of New Zealand
Moths described in 1929
Taxa named by Edward Meyrick
Endemic fauna of New Zealand
Endemic moths of New Zealand